Mission San Rafael Arcángel is a Spanish mission in San Rafael, California. It was founded in 1817 as a medical asistencia ("sub-mission") of Mission San Francisco de Asís. It was a hospital to treat sick Native Americans, making it Alta California's first sanitarium. The weather was much better than in San Francisco, which helped the ill get better.  It was not intended to be a stand-alone mission, but nevertheless grew and prospered and was granted full mission status on October 19, 1822.

History
 Mission San Rafael Arcángel was founded on December 14, 1817, by Father Vicente Francisco de Sarría, as a medical asistencia ("sub-mission") of the San Francisco Mission to treat their sick population. It was granted full mission status in 1822.

This was one of the missions turned over to the Mexican government in 1833 after the Mexican secularization act of 1833. In 1840, there were 150 Native Americans still at the Mission. By 1844, Mission San Rafael Arcángel had been abandoned; what was left of the empty buildings was sold for $8,000 in 1846. The Mission was used by John C. Fremont as his headquarters during the Bear Flag Revolt.

On June 28, 1846, three men departed the mission, including Kit Carson, and murdered three unarmed Californians under the order of John C. Fremont: Don José R. Berreyesa, father of José de los Santos Berreyesa, along with the twin sons of Don Francisco de Haro, Ramon and Francisco De Haro.

In 1847, a priest was once again living at the Mission. A new parish church was built near the old chapel ruins in 1861, and, in 1870, the rest of the ruins were removed to make room for the City of San Rafael. All that was left of the Mission was a single pear tree from the old Mission's orchard.  It is for this reason that San Rafael is known as the "most obliterated of California's missions".

In 1949, a replica of the chapel was built next to the current Saint Raphael's Church on the site of the original hospital in San Rafael, California which was built in 1919.

See also
 Spanish missions in California
 List of Spanish missions in California
 Chief Marin
 Mission San Francisco de Asís
 Mission San Francisco Solano
 USNS Mission San Rafael (AO-130) – a Buenaventura Class fleet oiler built during World War II.

Notes

References

External links

 "Mission San Rafael Arcángel, the Hospital That Became a Mission, via The California Frontier Project
 Early photographs, sketches, land surveys of Mission San Rafael Arcángel, via Calisphere, California Digital Library
 A historical drawing of the mission at the Bancroft Library
 

San Rafael Archangel
1817 in Alta California
San Rafael, California
Churches in Marin County, California
Museums in Marin County, California
History museums in California
Religious museums in California
1817 establishments in Alta California
Buildings and structures in San Rafael, California
California Historical Landmarks
History of Marin County, California